Jaganguda is a village in Medchal district in Telangana, India. It falls under Shamirpet mandal.Village surpanch Vishnuvardan and MPP Mrs. Murali.

References

Villages in Medchal–Malkajgiri district